Kent International Inc is an American bicycle manufacturer based in Parsippany, New Jersey. It imports and distributes bicycles and bicycle accessories worldwide. As of 2014, it was considered the 2nd largest manufacturer of bicycles in the United States.

History

Kent dates back to the early 1900s when Abraham Kamler, an immigrant to the United States, began restoring bicycles in New York City. Kamler opened his own bike shop on the Lower East Side in 1909 and later moved to a larger location in Newark, New Jersey.

The current President's father started his own company called Philkam Cycle in 1947, supplying bikes and parts to stores all over the Eastern United States. Philkam Cycle changed its name in 1958 to Kent International. In 1979 it began manufacturing bicycles in Kearny, New Jersey, but closed its factory and moved manufacturing overseas in 1990. It returned manufacturing to the United States in 2014, building a facility in Clarendon County, South Carolina.

Products

Kent markets the following products generally through large chain-stores and internet marketers:

Licensed brands
Six Licensed Brands:	
 Jeep Bikes which includes hybrid bikes and mountain bikes.
 GMC Bikes which includes road bikes and mountain bikes. (Not to be confused with the automotive manufacturer GMC)
 Razor Bikes which are higher-performance mountain bike style for children.
 Little Miss Match bicycles - "innovative designs" for girls bikes and helmets
 Cadillac - license expired.
 Genesis - exclusively sold at Walmart stores
 Margaritaville beach cruiser bicycles produced by Bicycle Corporation of America, a division of Kent International

Kent brand
Kent branded bikes
 Adult Bikes which includes all-terrain, cruiser, comfort and specialty models for adults.
 Kids Bikes which includes scooters in 10", 12", 14", 16", 18", 20", and 24" models.
 Specialty Bikes including tandems, adult tricycles, folders, portables, and other unique bicycles.

Accessories
 WeeRide Bikes which includes child and pet carriers, pushbikes, trailers, tag-a-longs etc.

References

External links

WeeRide Accessories

Road cycles
Cycle manufacturers of the United States
Companies based in Morris County, New Jersey
1909 establishments in New York City